Top Ten Is a humorous look at a set of top ten acts in various music and TV genres, broadcast on Channel 4 in the UK from 1995 to 2002. Each episode contains a rundown of top ten artists, characters and TV shows. The reason they qualify to appear in the top ten is based on a variety of criteria related to the genre they are in (or as Tony Blackburn put it in the Glam Top Ten episode "using facts, data and information"). The show has a format where the genre is introduced, a presenter introduces each of the acts and a narrator describes each of the acts in their segment. The show uses talking heads and archive footage to tell the story of each act with funny and interesting insights.

Episodes

References

Channel 4